The Cisco 12000, also known as a Gigabit Switch Router or GSR, is a series of large network routers designed and manufactured by Cisco Systems.

Features
Cisco 12000 series routers feature a high-performance switched backplane providing 2.4Gbit/s across 16 switched ports simultaneously.
The Multi-Service Blade module (introduced for the XR 12000 line) provides firewall and acts as a session border controller.

Criticism
Certain line cards in Cisco 12000 routers are potentially vulnerable to denial-of-service attacks. Additionally, certain software versions were vulnerable to specially crafted IPv4 packets.

See also
Cisco routers

References

External links
Cisco 12000 Series Routers
Cisco GSR on the CiscoClue wiki

12000
Hardware routers